

Brigilsus was a medieval Bishop of the East Angles.

Brigilsus was consecrated between 652 and 653. He died about 669 or 670. He was consecrated by Archbishop Honorius of Canterbury.

Notes

References

External links

Bishops of the East Angles